George Macy (1900–1956) was an American publisher.

Career 
George Macy was born in New York City in 1900.

In 1926, he founded Macy-Masius, which was sold to the Vanguard Press in 1928.

In 1929, he founded the Limited Editions Club, publishing finely illustrated books that were limited to 1500 copies and signed by the author or artist. By setting up a subscription service, Macy was able to work with a larger budget for subscribers. Artists contracted to illustrate books were given a lot of freedom and budget, but also sometimes lost his gambles.  The 1935 publication of James Joyce’s Ulysses was illustrated with line drawings by Henri Matisse, which are almost unrelated to the text.

In 1935, he expanded his publishing with The Heritage Press. Macy worked that year with Nonesuch Press to rescue it from its financial difficulties. The first project was with the complete works of Charles Dickens in 1938.

Macy became a Chevalier of the Legion of Honor after a 1948 display of his work. In 1952, the British Library held an exhibit of his work. He won the AIGA medal for his work as a publisher in 1953.

After Macy’s death from cancer in 1956, his wife, Helen Macy, continued the work of The Limited Editions Club and Heritage Press until 1968 when their son became head of the company.

References

External links 

 Finding aid to George Macy papers at Columbia University. Rare Book & Manuscript Library.

1900 births
1956 deaths
American publishers (people)
Chevaliers of the Légion d'honneur
Deaths from cancer
AIGA medalists